Romani is used as a surname and a given name. Notable people with the name are as follows:

People

Surname
Angelo Romani (1934–2003), Italian swimmer
Bruno Romani (born 1960), Italian saxophonist
Claudia Romani (born 1982), Italian American model
Darlan Romani (born 1991),  Brazilian track and field athlete specialising in the shot put
Elio Romani (1920–1999), Italian chess master
Felice Romani (1788–1865), Italian poet, scholar of literature and mythology, and opera librettist
Francesco Romani (1785–1852), Italian medical doctor
Girolamo Romani or Romanino (c. 1485 – c. 1566), Italian painter 
Juana Romani, (30 April 1867 – 1923/24), Italian-born French painter
Paolo Romani (born 1947), Italian politician
Roger Romani (born 1934), French politician

Given name
Romani (adventurer) (fl. 1682–1714), French adventurer
Romani Hansen (born 1997), American basketball player
Romani Rose (born 1946), Romany activist

Pen name
 Shabnam Romani, pen name of Urdu poet Mirza Azeem Baig Chughtai (1928–2009)

Fictional characters
Romani, one of the major characters in the video game The Legend of Zelda: Majora's Mask

Surnames of Italian origin
Masculine given names